The Bellolividae is a taxonomic family of sea snails, marine gastropod molluscs in the superfamily Olivoidea.

Genera
Genera within the family Bellolividae include:
 Belloliva Peile, 1922
 Jaspidella Olsson, 1956
 Olivellopsis Thiele, 1929
Genera brought into synonymy
 Janaoliva Sterba & Lorenz, 2005: synonym of Olivellopsis Thiele, 1929

References

External links
 Kantor Yu.I., Fedosov A.E., Puillandre N., Bonillo C. & Bouchet P. (2017). Returning to the roots: morphology, molecular phylogeny and classification of the Olivoidea (Gastropoda: Neogastropoda). Zoological Journal of the Linnean Society. 180(3): 493-541

 
Olivoidea
Gastropod families